Trikorfo may refer to the following places in Greece:

Trikorfo, Aetolia-Acarnania, part of Chalkeia in Aetolia-Acarnania 
Trikorfo, Grevena, part of Kosmas o Aitolos in the Grevena regional unit
Trikorfo, Messenia, a community in Messenia 
Trikorfo, Phocis, part of Efpalio in Phocis 
Trikorfo, Preveza, part of Parga in the Preveza regional unit